Aleksandr Semyonovich Panyushkin (14 August 1905, Samara – 12 November 1974, Moscow) was Soviet ambassador to the United States (and simultaneously resident) from 1947, transferring in July 1952 to ambassador to China. He headed the First Chief Directorate (foreign intelligence) of the KGB from July 1953 to June 1955.

1905 births
1974 deaths
People from Samara, Russia
People from Samarsky Uyezd
Central Committee of the Communist Party of the Soviet Union candidate members
Members of the Supreme Soviet of the Russian Soviet Federative Socialist Republic, 1967–1971
Members of the Supreme Soviet of the Russian Soviet Federative Socialist Republic, 1971–1975
Ambassador Extraordinary and Plenipotentiary (Soviet Union)
Ambassadors of the Soviet Union to the United States
Ambassadors of the Soviet Union to China
KGB officers
Frunze Military Academy alumni
Recipients of the Order of Lenin
Recipients of the Order of the Red Banner
Recipients of the Order of the Red Star